Epiphyas scleropa is a species of moth of the family Tortricidae. It is found in Australia, where it has been recorded from Victoria and New South Wales.

The wingspan is about 22–23 mm.

References

Moths described in 1910
Epiphyas